Kuusinen is a Finnish surname. Notable people with the surname include:

Otto Wille Kuusinen (1881–1964)
Aino Kuusinen (1886–1970), Finnish Communist
Hertta Kuusinen (1904–1974), Finnish Communist politician
Paavo Kuusinen (1914–1979)

Finnish-language surnames